Danny McAllister may refer to:

Danny McAllister (hurler) (1919-2008), Irish hurler for County Antrim
Danny McAllister (rugby league) (born 1974), Australian rugby league player